Chittaranjan Sutar (23 March 1928 - 27 November 2002) is a Bangladeshi politician and former Member of Parliament of Bangladesh from Bakerganj-14 (now Pirojpur-1).

Biography 
Suttar was an Awami League politician, he was sent to India to act as liaison between the Government of India and the Mujibnagar government during the Bangladesh Liberation war. He was based in Kolkata. He fled Bangladesh after the Assassination of Sheikh Mujibur Rahman in 1975 to Dhaka, Bangladesh. He became the leader of the Bangabhumi Movement. He has been accused by the Bangladesh Rifles Director General, Major General Jahangir Alam Chowdhury of leading Bir Banga, an insurgent group.

References 

Awami League politicians
1st Jatiya Sangsad members
1928 births
2002 deaths
People from Pirojpur District
People from Kolkata
Bangladesh Krishak Sramik Awami League central committee members